Haakonsvern is the main base of the Royal Norwegian Navy and the largest naval base in the Nordic area. The base is located at Mathopen within Bergen municipality, about 15 km south-west of the city centre. Around 5,400 people work at the base as conscripts, officers or civilian staff.

The base was established in 1962 when the main naval activities were moved from Horten in the Oslofjord to Bergen. It is the main base for most vessels within the Royal Norwegian Navy and frequently visited by allied vessels. Haakonsvern contains the Royal Norwegian Naval Training Establishment (KNM Tordenskjold) as well as repair and maintenance facilities, including an underground dock facility with the capacity to take frigates.

External links 

   

Royal Norwegian Navy bases
Military installations in Bergen
1962 establishments in Norway